Sadayoshi Kobayashi (February 14, 1905 – May 23, 1997) was a Japanese field hockey player who competed in the 1932 Summer Olympics.

In 1932 he was a member of the Japanese field hockey team, which won the silver medal. He played two matches as back.

He was born in Kanagawa Prefecture, Japan.

References

External links
 
profile

1905 births
1997 deaths
Sportspeople from Kanagawa Prefecture
Japanese male field hockey players
Olympic field hockey players of Japan
Field hockey players at the 1932 Summer Olympics
Olympic silver medalists for Japan
Olympic medalists in field hockey
Medalists at the 1932 Summer Olympics
20th-century Japanese people